Holwell  may refer to:

Places
Holwell, Dorset
Holwell, Hertfordshire (formerly in Bedfordshire)
Holwell, Leicestershire
Holwell, Oxfordshire
Holwell, Somerset
Holwell, Tasmania

Other uses
Holwell (surname)